{{DISPLAYTITLE:C20H30O}}
The molecular formula C20H30O (molar mass: 286.45 g/mol, exact mass: 286.229666 u) may refer to:

 Ferruginol, a meroterpene natural phenol
 Retinol, Vitamin A1
 Taxadienone
 Totarol, a meroterpene natural phenol